Shakin' Stevens is the debut solo album by Welsh rock and roll singer Shakin' Stevens, released in April 1978 by Track Records.

Background and release 
From 1969, Stevens was the frontman of the rock and roll group Shakin' Stevens and the Sunsets. However, in 1976, he was offered the chance to record some solo tracks with Track Records. Two singles, "Never" and "Somebody Touched Me", were released in March and September 1977, respectively. Neither made any impact on the UK charts, although the latter somehow managed to creep into the Top 40 in Australia. Shortly after the release of "Somebody Touched Me", Stevens landed a leading role in Jack Good's West End musical Elvis!, playing the middle role of Elvis Presley's career alongside Tim Whitnall and P. J. Proby. With interest in Shaky now increasing, Track decided to go ahead and record an album with the hope of capitalising on the singer's newly heightened profile.

After seeing a performance on a TV special called Don't Knock the Rock, Stevens recruited the services of group Sounds Incorporated. Joined by Stevens' old Sunsets bandmate Ace Skudder on piano, the band went into Island's Basing Street Studios on 8 January 1978. With Bob Marley recording in the next door studio and under the musical direction of saxophonist Alan Holmes, producers Mike Shaw and John Fenton captured an album's worth of material in a single day.

Preceded by the single "Justine", issued just a few weeks after the session in January, the album Shakin' Stevens was released in April 1978. Unfortunately, the record flopped soon after the album's release, Track Records ceased operations. However, by the end of the year, Epic Records had signed Stevens and in the wake of his success in the 1980s, the album was re-released by Track's parent company Polydor in 1983.

Although the album is officially titled Shakin' Stevens, the record labels carried the instruction 'Play Loud' which has led many fans and discographers to refer to the album by this title.

Track listing

Personnel 
Musicians
 Shakin' Stevens – vocals
 Phil Palmer – guitar
 Jo Partridge – guitar
 Dick Thomas – bass
 Ace Skudder – piano
 Tony Newman – drums
 Alan Holmes – saxophones

Technical
 Phill Brown – engineer
 John Dent – mastering
 Alan Holmes – music director
 Jo Mirowski – sleeve design
 Jill Mumford – sleeve design
 Gered Mankowitz – photography

References 

1978 albums
Shakin' Stevens albums
Track Records albums
Polydor Records albums